Oak Park Ice Arena is an indoor arena located in the Detroit suburb of Oak Park, Michigan. It was built in 1971 and was a temporary home for the Detroit Whalers of the Ontario Hockey League in 1996. Current teams that call the rink home include, the Little Ceasers AAA Hockey Club, Brother Rice High school, and Rolston Hockey Academy.

References

Ontario Hockey League arenas
Sports venues in Michigan
Indoor ice hockey venues in Michigan
Sports venues completed in 1971
1971 establishments in Michigan